The following is a comprehensive discography of The Flying Burrito Brothers, an American country rock band which has evolved over time and released material under several different names. Their initial recordings were led by Gram Parsons and Chris Hillman who had recently left The Byrds. Parsons was replaced by Rick Roberts who continued to tour with the band even after the departure of Hillman. By 1975 a new lineup focused around Gib Guilbeau and other Byrds alumni such as Skip Battin and Gene Parsons. In 1977 the band recorded an album that their record company released under the name "Sierra" much to their surprise.  By the 1980s, and after several lineup changes, the band was mostly associated with Gib Gilbeau and John Beland. They relented to record company pressure and once again changed the name of the band to just "The Burrito Brothers". Sneaky Pete Kleinow's pedal steel guitar playing was generally the only constant with each lineup change during this era.

John Beland "retired" the Flying Burrito Brothers name in 2000.   In 2002, Sneaky Pete Kleinow and other musicians recorded under the name "Burrito Deluxe." Burrito Deluxe recorded three albums with various musicians, many of whom at one time had been members of the Flying Burrito Brothers in one capacity or another. After still more lineup changes, Burrito Deluxe recorded an album as simply "The Burritos" before reverting to their 1980s moniker: The Burrito Brothers. In 2020, The Burrito Brothers revived the Burrito Deluxe name for a rarities compilation.

Albums

Studio albums

Live albums

Compilation albums

Notable Import Releases

Releases listed were not released in the US in any form:

Singles (US)

References 

Country music discographies
Discographies of American artists